Valentin Alexandrovich Ternavtsev (27 February 1866 in Melitopol, Tavria Governorate, Russian Empire (modern Ukraine) – 28 August 1940 in Serpukhov, Moskovskaya Oblast, USSR) was a Russian author, publisher and religious activist, one of the organisers of the Religious and Philosophical Society (1901-1903). A high-ranking Synod official in 1906-1917, Ternavtsev had the reputation of an active reformist in the Russian Orthodox Church hierarchy.

References

1866 births
1940 deaths
People from Melitopol
Recipients of the Order of St. Anna, 3rd class
Recipients of the Order of Saint Stanislaus (Russian), 3rd class
Russian Orthodox Christians from Russia
National University of Kharkiv alumni